Ølsted may refer to:

 Ølsted, Halsnæs Municipality, a town in Denmark
 Ølsted, Aarhus Municipality, a village in Denmark

See also
 Olmsted (disambiguation)
 Ørsted (disambiguation)